Raymond Routledge, best known as Ray Routledge (October 9, 1931 – November 12, 2008) was an American amateur and professional bodybuilder. He was crowned AAU Mr. America in 1961. He held the title of Amateur Mr. Universe the same year. 

Routledge died at the age of 77 in San Bernardino, California in November 2008.

See also
List of male professional bodybuilders

References

External links 
Pearl, Routledge Win 'Universe' Titles 1962 article by Oscar Heidenstam

1931 births
2008 deaths
American bodybuilders
People associated with physical culture
Professional bodybuilders